The 1888 United States presidential election in South Carolina took place on November 6, 1888, as part of the 1888 United States presidential election. Voters chose 9 representatives, or electors to the Electoral College, who voted for president and vice president.

South Carolina voted for the Democratic nominee, incumbent President Grover Cleveland, over the Republican nominee, Benjamin Harrison. Cleveland won the state by a landslide margin of 65.11%.

Results

References

South Carolina
1888
1888 South Carolina elections